Beverly Baker Fleitz (March 13, 1930 – April 29, 2014) was a women's tennis player from the United States who was active in the late 1940s and during the 1950s. According to John Olliff and Lance Tingay of The Daily Telegraph and the Daily Mail, Fleitz was ranked in the world top 10 in 1951, 1954, 1955, 1958, and 1959, reaching a career high of World No. 3 in those rankings in 1954, 1955, and 1958. Fleitz was included in the year-end top 10 rankings issued by the United States Lawn Tennis Association from 1948 through 1951 and in 1954, 1955, 1958, and 1959. She was the top-ranked U.S. player in 1959. She was ambidextrous and played with two forehands.

Career
Fleitz began playing tennis at age 11 and played mostly on public courts in Lincoln Park in Santa Monica, California. Her father Frank Baker was her only coach and was the assistant director of recreation for the city of Santa Monica.

During 11 of the 12 weeks following June 19, 1950, Fleitz competed in tournaments across the U.S. In singles, she won three titles, was the runner-up three times, and was a semifinalist at both the U.S. National Championships and the U.S. Women's Clay Court Championships. Her six losses during this period were to Doris Hart (twice), Margaret Osborne duPont (twice), Maureen Connolly, and Magda Berescu Rurac. She recorded wins over Louise Brough, Connolly, Berescu Rurac, Patricia Canning Todd, and Dorothy Bundy Cheney. In women's doubles, she was a quarterfinalist at the U.S. National Doubles Championships.

Grand Slam tournaments
At the U.S. National Championships, Fleitz reached the semifinals twice and the quarterfinals in four of her six other attempts. She played Grand Slam singles tournaments outside the U.S. only six times. At the 1951 Wimbledon Championships, she defeated Althea Gibson in the third round 6–1, 6–3 and Margaret Osborne duPont in the quarterfinals before falling to Doris Hart in the semifinals 6–3, 6–1. Fleitz was the top seed at the 1955 French International Championships, but she was upset by fourth-seeded Dorothy Head Knode in the semifinals 6–2, 6–3.

At the 1955 Wimbledon Championships, third-seeded Fleitz defeated top-seeded Hart in the semifinals 6–3, 6–0, which was the last Wimbledon singles match of Hart's career. Fleitz then played second-seeded Louise Brough in the final. Fleitz was the first mother to play in a Wimbledon singles final since Dorothea Douglass Lambert Chambers in 1920. Fleitz had won the last four matches with Brough since the beginning of 1954, but Brough prevailed on this day 7–5, 8–6 in 1 hour, 32 minutes. The veteran BBC tennis broadcaster Max Robertson observed "Louise was always prone to tighten up at important points, but [she] had a greater breadth of stroke and experience at her command, which just saw her through a keenly fought struggle. In the sixth game of the second set, for example, it was only after nine deuces and five [game points for] ... Fleitz that [on the game's 24th point] Louise wrong-footed her ... [nearly] exhausted opponent with a backhand slice down the line to lead 4-2. That was the turning point, and Louise went on to win her fourth [Wimbledon] singles [title]...." Afterwards, Fleitz said "I've no excuses for my defeat. Louise was just marvelous today. She played as well as I've ever seen her play and well deserved her victory."

At the 1956 Wimbledon Championships, Fleitz reached the quarterfinals, then she was forced to withdraw from the tournament because of a pregnancy-related illness. She last played Wimbledon in 1959 as the third-seeded player. Unseeded Edda Buding from West Germany defeated her in the fourth round 8–6, 2–6, 7–5.

Fleitz never played contemporaries Angela Mortimer, Ann Haydon, Christine Truman, Darlene Hard, Maureen Connolly, or Shirley Fry in a Grand Slam singles tournament. Her win–loss record against other top players at those tournaments was as follows: Althea Gibson 2–1, Doris Hart 1–2, Louise Brough 0–3, Margaret Osborne duPont 2–1, and Maria Bueno 1–0.

Fleitz's only Grand Slam title was in women's doubles at the 1955 French International Championships. In the final, she and partner Darlene Hard needed 50 games to defeat their opponents in the longest Grand Slam women's doubles final of all time.

Other tournaments

Outside of the U.S., Fleitz won singles tournaments in Bermuda, England, Ireland, Mexico, and West Germany. She was the runner-up at tournaments in Cuba and England.

Within the U.S., she was the runner-up at the 1949 U.S. Clay Court Championships, losing to former Romanian national champion Magda Berescu Rurac. Fleitz won the U.S. Hardcourt Championships three times, in 1954, 1957, and 1958. She defeated future Wimbledon singles champion Karen Hantze in the 1958 final. In tournaments sponsored by sections (regions) of the United States Lawn Tennis Association, Fleitz was the singles champion of the Southern California section four times (1954, 1955, 1956, and 1958), the Pacific Northwest section once, and the Western section once.

In March 1954, Fleitz defeated Maureen Connolly 6–0, 6–4 at a tournament in La Jolla, California, which was the last time anyone defeated Connolly in a singles tournament and her only loss of 1954. Connolly had won the last seven Grand Slam singles tournaments she had played. Fleitz won four of their nine career singles matches.

Fleitz was a four-time singles champion at the Pacific Southwest Championships in Los Angeles (1947, 1955, 1958, and 1959) and was the runner-up three times. She defeated Hard in the 1958 final and Bueno in the 1959 final. At the Tri-State Championships in Cincinnati, Fleitz won the 1950 singles title and was the runner-up in 1949, with Berescu Rurac being her opponent in both finals.

Retirement years

Fleitz retired permanently from singles tennis in 1959 and was inducted into the Southern California Tennis Association Hall of Fame in 2005.

Personal life
She married actor Scotty Beckett on September 28, 1949 in Las Vegas, Nevada. Baker was granted a divorce in June 1950. She married tennis player John Fleitz on October 6, 1951. They had five daughters together. John Fleitz died in Long Beach, California on November 14, 2011 at age 82.

She can be heard as a contestant on the 7th November 1951 edition of You Bet Your Life.

Grand Slam finals

Singles: (1 runner-up)

Doubles: (1 title, 1 runner-up)

Other singles finals (38 titles, 13 runner-ups)

Grand Slam tournament timeline

Singles

1In 1947, the French International Championships were held after the Wimbledon Championships.

Doubles

See also 
 Performance timelines for all female tennis players who reached at least one Grand Slam final

References 

1930 births
2014 deaths
American female tennis players
French Championships (tennis) champions
Sportspeople from Bakersfield, California
Tennis players from Santa Monica, California
Grand Slam (tennis) champions in women's doubles
21st-century American women